Rookwood Apartments is a historic apartment building at 718-734 Noyes Street in Evanston, Illinois. The three-story brick building was built in 1927. Architects Conner & O'Connor designed the building in the Tudor Revival style. The building's design includes limestone trim, large square blocks of stone separating the casement windows, and ashlar stone entrances and courtyard walls. The building is noteworthy among Evanston's apartments for its two courtyards; one is open and faces the street, while the second is more private and to the side of the building.

The building was added to the National Register of Historic Places on March 15, 1984.

References

Buildings and structures on the National Register of Historic Places in Cook County, Illinois
Residential buildings on the National Register of Historic Places in Illinois
Buildings and structures in Evanston, Illinois
Apartment buildings in Illinois
Tudor Revival architecture in Illinois
Residential buildings completed in 1927